Gur i Bardhë (in English: White Stone; also known in the Middle Ages as Petralba) is a village in the municipality of Klos, Albania.

History
Gur i Bardhë is a small mountain village that occurs above the Mat Valley. There is still no exact date that corresponds to the establishment of this village, but the few excavations and discoveries that have been made in this village reveal its early existence. Stone working tools that match the time of stone use have been found. Also discovered are many old cemeteries with various symbolic objects and engraved stone tiles. Some historians such have connected the name Petralba with Albanopolis, a Roman-era city mentioned by Ptolemy.

Gur i Bardhë (Bilakamin) is recorded in the Ottoman defter of 1467 as a hass-ı mir-liva settlement in the vilayet of Mati. The village had a total of 46 households and the anthroponymy attested depicts an Albanian character: Andrija Gazi, Peter Limani, Gazi, Gjeç Aleksi, Ishri Buluzi, Dhonabi son-in-law of Ishri, Gjin Rakizi, Martin Muzaka, Kita Dajxhi, Lesh Çokani, Gjon Puliti, Lazar Thana, Kola Spavali, Gjin Boliti, Gjon Senkuri, Kal Sghuni, Gjergj Bulushi, Andrija Shirgji, Lika Duka, Lazar Bulushi, Mastër Nikolla, Gjin Nikolla, Lal Nikolla, Veske, Lalnikolla, Gjin Spavali, Gjergj Jani, Kal Mizi, Todor Kuprini, Gjin Biza, Peter Skalabra, Gjin Skalabra, Andrija Koçani, Gjin Mirzi, Gjergj Bratisllavi, Peter Boliti, Engjëll Koçani, Gjon Bulushi, Nika Gazi, Gjon Spavali, Peter Lumashi, Nika Gropa, Peter Bulushi, and Gjin Koçani.

References

Populated places in Mat (municipality)
Villages in Dibër County